Honey's Dead is the fourth studio album by the Scottish alternative rock band The Jesus and Mary Chain, released in 1992 on Blanco y Negro Records. It marked a return to a more abrasive sound for the group, as well as incorporating elements of alternative dance. The title refers to one of the band's early hits, "Just Like Honey", and is intended to demonstrate a complete departure from their earlier musical style.

The album's first single, "Reverence", attracted some controversy for the lyrics "I want to die just like Jesus Christ", and "I want to die just like JFK". Banned by Top of the Pops, the track peaked at #10 in the UK charts and received airplay in the United States on alternative radio stations.

Honey's Dead was recorded in the band's London studio, the aptly named "Drugstore", with accomplished engineer Flood and future JaMC producer Alan Moulder on board (not to mention a considerably larger bankroll).

Alternative and campus radio stations picked up "Far Gone and Out" which remains one of the band's most popular singles to date, peaking at #23 in the band's native UK. The Mary Chain shared the bill during parts of Lollapalooza 1992 in the U.S. with Pearl Jam, Soundgarden, Ministry, Lush, Ice Cube and Red Hot Chili Peppers. Anheuser Busch even used the samples of "Sugar Ray" as a background bed for their Bud Ice television commercials in 1993.

Honey's Dead was on the short list of nominees for the 1992 Mercury Prize.
The album posts a close second in sales to (1994) release Stoned & Dethroned (which contains the hit single "Sometimes Always" with Hope Sandoval of Mazzy Star). The Reid brothers alternate between singing duties on tracks (most likely coinciding with songwriting duties).

Artwork
The album cover art features a detail from the painting Ophelia (First Version) by the Pre-Raphaelite painter Arthur Hughes.

As of May 1998 the album has sold 122,000 copies in United States according to Nielsen SoundScan.

Track listing
All songs written by Jim Reid and William Reid.

LP (BYN 26) and Cassette (BYNC 26)

Side one
"Reverence" – 3:40
"Teenage Lust" – 3:06
"Far Gone and Out" – 2:51
"Almost Gold" – 3:19
"Sugar Ray" – 4:41
"Tumbledown" – 4:10

Side two
"Catchfire" – 4:47
"Good for My Soul" – 3:05
"Rollercoaster" – 3:46
"I Can't Get Enough" – 2:56
"Sundown" – 4:59
"Frequency" – 1:19

CD (BYNCD 26)
"Reverence" – 3:40
"Teenage Lust" – 3:06
"Far Gone and Out" – 2:51
"Almost Gold" – 3:19
"Sugar Ray" – 4:41
"Tumbledown" – 4:10
"Catchfire" – 4:47
"Good for My Soul" – 3:05
"Rollercoaster" – 3:46
"I Can't Get Enough" – 2:56
"Sundown" – 4:59
"Frequency" – 1:19

Notes
 Track 6: Contains a sample of Einstürzende Neubauten's "Tanz Debil" (Kollaps, 1981) starting at 1:25 and lasting for roughly 18 seconds.
 Track 9: Is listed as "copyright 1990" (while the rest of the album is "copyright 1992"), but the version here is not the original 1990 EP version.  This version features live drums (presumably by Monti) and does not have the echo on William Reid's voice, and is likely a re-recorded version from the album sessions.

Personnel
The Jesus and Mary Chain
Jim Reid – vocals (tracks 1, 2, 3, 5, 6, 8), guitar, producer
William Reid – vocals (tracks 4, 7, 9, 10, 11, 12), guitar, producer
Steve Monti – drums, percussion

Additional personnel
Alan Moulder – engineer (except track 9), mixing
Flood – engineer (track 9)
Andy Catlin – photography

References

The Jesus and Mary Chain albums
1992 albums
Blanco y Negro Records albums